Water Vision 2025 is a National Water resource and Hydropower Development Program being undertaken by WAPDA to tackle the severe water and energy crisis in Pakistan. Since the construction of Mangla Dam, the country's population has risen to 180 million and is estimated to reach 280 million by 2025, resulting in a severe energy and water crisis.

In this comprehensive development program, five hydropower projects are to be completed by 2016 with capacity of 9,500 MW.

Phases of Water Vision 2025

Phase one envisions construction of the Gomal Dam and the Mirani Dam, the Mithan Kot barrage at Kachhi canal (Balochistan). phase 1 of Greater Thal canal (Punjab) and Thar/ Rainee canal (Sindh). Mangla Dam and feasibility study of Bhasha Dam site will be initiated. The estimated cost for these projects will be $2.467 billion, with a construction period of five years.

Under phase 2 Hingol (Balochistan), Satpara (Northern Areas), Sanjwal (Punjab) and Kurram Tangi Dams (KPK), the Gajnai and Sehwan barrages (Sindh), alongside Chashma Right Bank canal, phase 2 of the Greater Thal canal Akhori and phase 2 of Thar/ Rainee canals in 3–6 years. Bhasha Dam will take 8–10 years for its completion. The estimated cost for these projects will be $8.94 billion.

Under Phase 3, the Yugo, Skardu, Dhok-Tallian, Rohtas, Naulong and Khadji dams will be completed.

2013

Presently 16 hydroelectric projects are expected to be online by 2020, according to a report given at the 92nd meeting of Pakistan's Private Power and Infrastructure Board (PPIB) in February 2013.

Included in the list of pending hydropower plants are the 665-MW Lower Palas Valley and 496-MW Lower Spat Gah hydropower projects, both contracted via public-private memoranda of understanding in December 2012.

PPIB approved the extension of letters of support for the 100-MW Gulpur and 548-MW Kaigah hydropower projects, in addition to authorizing development of the 90-MW Neckeherdim-Paur and 58-MW Turtonas-Uzghor hydroelectric plants.

The Board reported that the 84-MW New Bong complex would be commissioned next month and work on the 147-MW Patrind was progressing. PBIB said as much as 7,032 MW of installed capacity will be added to Pakistan's power supply via hydropower by the end of the decade.

See also 
 WAPDA
 Electricity sector in Pakistan
 Economy of Pakistan
 Alternative Energy Development Board
 National Electric Power Regulatory Authority
 Karachi Electric Supply Company

References

External links 
 Water and Power Development Authority

Water supply and sanitation in Pakistan
Water and Power Development Authority
Electric power in Pakistan
2010s in Pakistan
2020s in Pakistan